A water conservation order is a legal ruling to protect aspects of water bodies. It may be to protect the quantity of the water itself or for any issues relating to the water body as a whole.

New Zealand
In New Zealand, a Water Conservation Order is used to protect the natural, cultural and recreational values of any water body.  Water Conservation Orders came about as a result of lobbying by a group of stakeholders in the late seventies.  At that time rivers were managed through the Water & Soil Conservation Act, which was administered by an appointed statutory body (NWASCA) serviced by the Ministry of Works.  The engineers of the Ministry of Works argued that there was no need to legislate further as the Act contained provision for setting Minimum Flows.

There are currently 15 separate Water Conservation Orders:

Ahuriri River
Buller River
Grey River
Kawarau River
Lake Wairarapa
Manganuioteao River
Mataura River
Mohaka River
Motueka River
Mōtū River
Ōreti River
Rakaia River
Rangitata River
Rangitīkei River
Te Waihora Lake Ellesmere

A water conservation order has been proposed for the Hurunui River in the South Island.

Irrigation New Zealand, the national body representing agricultural irrigators and the irrigation industry, opposes water conservation orders. Irrigation NZ considers they no longer have relevance, they lock up the water resource and they may bankrupt the nation.

References

External links
Water Conservation Orders New Zealand Recreational Canoeing Association web pages describing New Zealand water conservation orders.
Water Conservation Orders Environmental Defence Society RMA Guide web page.

Water law
Environmental policy in New Zealand
Water and the environment
Water in New Zealand